Brandon was a federal electoral district in the province of Manitoba, Canada, that was represented in the House of Commons of Canada from 1896 to 1953.

It was created in 1892 from parts of Marquette and Selkirk ridings.

In 1952, the constituency was merged with the constituency of Souris to form the district of Brandon—Souris.

Members of Parliament 

This riding has elected the following Members of Parliament:

 1896: D'Alton McCarthy - McCarthyite
 1896-1911: Sir Clifford Sifton - Liberal
 1911-1917: James Albert Manning Aikins - Conservative Party of Canada
 1917-1921: Howard Primrose Widden - Unionist Party
 1921-1930: Robert Forke - Progressive Party of Canada (1921–1926), Liberal-Progressive (1926–1930)
 1930:  Thomas Alexander Crerar - Liberal
 1930-1938: David Wilson Beaubier - Conservative Party of Canada
 1938-1950: James Ewen Matthews - Liberal
 1951-1952: Walter Dinsdale - Progressive Conservative

Election results 
By-election: On the death of Mr. Matthews' on 24 November 1950

By-election: On the death of Mr. Beaubier on 1 September 1938

By-election: On the appointment of Mr. Forke to the senate on 30 December 1929

By-election: On the appointment of Mr. Forke as Minister of Immigration and Colonization on 5 October 1926

By-election: Mr McCarthy elected to sit for Simcoe North on 25 August 1896

See also 

 Brandon—Souris
 List of Canadian federal electoral districts
 Past Canadian electoral districts

External links 
 

Former federal electoral districts of Manitoba